"Ebb Tide" is a popular song, written in 1953 by the lyricist Carl Sigman and composer Robert Maxwell. 
This song is not to be confused with the title song from the movie Ebb Tide (1937), which is a composition by Leo Robin and Ralph Rainger.

Background
The song's build up is to illustrate the ocean waves coming in and out to and from the shores, due to the ebb tides. It also echoes the rise and fall of sexual desire.

Recordings
The best-known versions are by: 
In 1953, Frank Chacksfield and his Orchestra went to number two on the US pop chart, and number nine on the UK chart.
Vic Damone (1953)
In 1954, Roy Hamilton went to number five on the US Best Sellers in Stores chart.
Frank Sinatra (1958)
The Avalons (1958) on the B side of Hearts Desire.
The Platters (1960)
Earl Grant (1961)
Lenny Welch (1964)
In 1965, the Righteous Brothers vocal version was the most successful, peaking at number five on the US Hot 100. Bobby Hatfield sang the lead on this song, and it was one of the last songs that Phil Spector produced for the Righteous Brothers.
Patti LaBelle and the Bluebelles (1966)
Mina (Italian singer) (1966)
In 1968, Gianni Morandi recorded an Italian version of the song, under the title, Come il mar (Like the Sea).
Tom Jones (1971)

References

External links 
List of albums containing recordings of "Ebb Tide"

1953 songs
1964 singles
1965 singles
1966 singles
Songs with music by Robert Maxwell (songwriter)
Song recordings produced by Phil Spector
Song recordings with Wall of Sound arrangements
Songs written by Carl Sigman
The Righteous Brothers songs
Frank Sinatra songs
Vic Damone songs
Labelle songs
Parlophone singles
Santo & Johnny songs
Canadian-American Records singles